Sir Richard Douglas Lapthorne CBE (born 25 April 1943) is an English company director, best  known for his role at Cable & Wireless Worldwide.

He was knighted in the 2010 New Year Honours for services to telecommunications.

References

1943 births
Alumni of the University of Liverpool
English businesspeople
Living people
Unilever people
Knights Bachelor
Commanders of the Order of the British Empire
Fellows of the Association of Chartered Certified Accountants